This article contains episode information and plot summaries from the 3rd series of the Children's British television programme Balamory. Season 3 was broadcast on 20 September 2004.

Cast
 The main cast are listed on the main Balamory page.

Episodes
Kasia Haddad replaces Buki Akib for taking the role of Josie Jump.

References 

Balamory
2004 Scottish television seasons
2004 British television seasons